The ii–V–I progression ("two–five–one progression") (occasionally referred to as ii–V–I turnaround, and ii–V–I) is a common cadential chord progression used in a wide variety of music genres, including jazz harmony. It is a succession of chords whose roots descend in fifths from the second degree (supertonic) to the fifth degree (dominant), and finally to the tonic. In a major key, the supertonic triad (ii) is minor, and in a minor key it is diminished. The dominant is, in its normal form, a major triad and commonly a dominant seventh chord. With the addition of chord alterations, substitutions, and extensions, limitless variations exist on this simple formula.

The ii–V–I progression is "a staple of virtually every type of [Western] popular music", including jazz, R&B, pop, rock, and country. Examples include "Honeysuckle Rose" (1928), which, "features several bars in which the harmony goes back and forth between the II and V chords before finally resolving on the I chord," "Satin Doll" (1953), and "If I Fell".

Jazz 

ii–V–I progressions are extremely common in jazz. They serve two primary functions, which are often intertwined: to temporarily imply passing tonalities and to lead strongly toward a goal (the "I" chord). One potential situation where ii–V–I progressions can be put to use is in blues, whose generic form has no such progressions. In the example below, a simple 12-bar F blues is shown followed by a similar one with some basic ii–V–I substitutions (in bold).

|  →  
|

|}

In bar 4, instead of the simple V–I root motion in the original blues, the ii chord of the B7 (Cm) is included so that the measure is even more directed toward the following downbeat with the B7. In bars 8–10, instead of leading back to the tonic with the standard V–IV–I (blues cadence), a series of applied ii–V–I progressions is used to first lead to Gm, which then itself is reinterpreted as a ii and used to lead back to F7 through its own V, which is C7. In the last bar (the "turnaround"), the same type of substitution is used as that in bar 4. In practice, musicians often extend the basic chords shown here, especially to 7ths, 9ths, and 13ths, as seen in this example:
iim9 V913 Imaj9
In jazz, the ii is typically played as a minor 7th chord, and the I is typically played as a major 7th chord (though it can also be played as a major 6th chord). The ii7–V7–Imaj7 progression provides smooth voice leading between the thirds and sevenths of these chords; the third of one chord becomes the seventh of the next chord, and the seventh of one chord moves down a half-step to become the third of the next chord. For example, in the key of C, the standard jazz ii–V–I progression is Dm7–G7–Cmaj7, and the thirds and sevenths of these chords are F–C, B–F, E–B; inverted for smoother voice leading, these become F–C, F–B, E–B.

The ii is sometimes replaced by the II7, giving it a more dissonant, bluesy feel; this is especially common in turnarounds. Additionally, the ii can be treated like a temporary minor tonic, and preceded by its own "ii–V", extending the basic progression to a iii–VI–ii–V–I; again, this is quite common in turnarounds (with the iii–VI replacing the I in the second-to-last bar; in the example above, the last two bars would change from F7 | Gm–C7 to Am–D7 | Gm–C7).

The ii–V7–I can be further modified by applying a tritone substitution to the V7 chord, replacing it with the II7 chord. This is possible because the II7 has the same third and seventh as the V7, but inverted; for example, the third and seventh of G7 are B and F, while the third and seventh of D7 are F and C, which is enharmonic to B. Performing this substitution (in this case, changing Dm7–G7–Cmaj7 to Dm7–D7–Cmaj7) creates smooth chromatic movement in the chord roots—the root of the ii (D) moves down a half-step to become the root of the II7 (D), which moves down another half-step to become the root of the I (C).

The tritone substitution, the substitution of II7 for V7, and the III–VI–II–V extension can be combined in different permutations to produce many different variations on the same basic progression—e.g. iii7–III7–iim7–II7–Imaj7–III7–III7–II7–II7–I7, etc.

Classical 

A ii–V–I progression is part of the vi–ii–V–I progression of root movement by descending fifths, which establishes tonality and also strengthens the key through the contrast of minor and major.

In minor, a seventh chord built on the supertonic yields a half-diminished seventh chord, which is a very strong predominant chord. Due to what is considered the harsh nature of root position diminished chords, the ii chord most often appears in first inversion.

The ii chord appears in the natural minor scale and may be considered a minor seventh chord with a flatted fifth and is used in the ii–V–I in minor

See also 
Approach chord
Bird changes
Circle progression
Side-slipping
Tadd Dameron turnaround

Sources

External links 

Cadences
Chord progressions
Circle of fifths
Jazz terminology